Frank Nelson may refer to:

Sir Frank Nelson (British politician) (1883–1966), British civil servant and politician
Frank Nelson (athlete) (1887–1970), American athlete and baseball player
Frank Nelson (actor) (1911–1986), American radio and television actor
Frank Nelson (Western Samoan politician) (1917–1967), Western Samoan politician 
Frank Nelson (priest), Anglican Dean of Adelaide
Frank Nelson (Argentinian actor) (born 1930), German-born Argentinian actor featured in Closed Door, Enigma de mujer or Graciela

See also
Francis Nelson (disambiguation)